Luis de Cortazar was a governor of the Mexican state of Guanajuato (26 August 1837 to October 1839).
Cortazar had a nearly four decades political and military career marked by switching of sides. Luis' brother Manuel, a lawyer, had an important and equally checkered career that lasted almost five decades.

Year of birth missing
Year of death missing
Governors of Guanajuato
19th-century Mexican people